Cyphotilapia gibberosa is a species of fish in the cichlid family, one of two species in the genus Cyphotilapia. Native to Lake Tanganyika in East Africa, it was described in 2003 nearly 100 years after its congener, C. frontosa. This species is a maternal mouth brooder.

Distribution
Cyphotilapia gibberosa is endemic to Lake Tanganyika in East Africa like C. frontosa. It is found in the southern half of this lake, whereas C. frontosa inhabits the northern half.

References
 
 Maréchal, C. and M. Poll, 1991. Boulengerochromis.. p. 27-28. In: J. Daget, J.-P. Gosse, G.G. Teugels and D.F.E. Thys van den Audenaerde (eds.) Check-list of the freshwater fishes of Africa (CLOFFA). ISNB, Brussels; MRAC, Tervuren; and ORSTOM, Paris. Vol. 4.

gibberosa
Cichlid fish of Africa
Fish described in 2003